

Fencers and coaches of the Olympic era

Austria

 Albert Bogen (Albert Bógathy), Austrian sabreur, Olympic silver
 Siegfried Flesch, Austrian sabreur and Olympic bronze medallist
 Otto Herschmann, Austrian sabreur; one of only a few athletes to have won Olympic medals in different sports; won silver medal in sabre team competition in 1912
 Ellen Preis, Austrian fencer (foil), Olympic champion

Belarus

 Alexandr Romankov, foilist
 Viktor Sidjak, Olympic (1972) and World (1969) Champion, winner of the 1972 & 1973 World Cup, also member of the winning team at 1968, 1976, and 1980 Olympics and at 1969, 1970, 1971, 1974, 1975, and 1979 World Team Championships; pupil of David Tyshler

Belgium

 Henri Anspach, Belgian fencer (épée and foil), Olympic champion
 Paul Anspach, Belgian fencer (épée and foil), two-time Olympic champion
 Jacques Ochs, Belgian fencer (épée), Olympic champion
 Gaston Salmon, Belgian fencer (épée), Olympic champion

Brazil

 Fernando Scavasin, Brazilian fencer. Competed in the foil events at the 2016 Summer Olympics.
 Roberto Lazzarini, Brazilian fencer. Competed at the 1988 and 1992 Summer Olympics.
 Élora Pattaro, Brazilian fencer. Competed in the women's individual sabre event at the 2004 Summer Olympics.
 Renzo Agresta, Brazilian fencer. Competed in the individual sabre events at the 2004, 2008 and 2012 Summer Olympics.

Bulgaria

Vasil Etropolski (born 1959), Bulgarian (sabre), world champion and Olympic fencer

China

 Jin Jing, Chinese wheelchair fencer who became a national celebrity following an incident during the 2008 Summer Olympics torch relay
 Ju-Jie Luan, Chinese fencer & coach, gold medallist for Women's Foil at 1984 Summer Olympics
 Wang Lei, Olympic Men's Individual Épée Silver Medal 2004
 Zhong Man, 2008 Olympic Men's Individual Sabre Champion

Denmark

 Ellen Osiier, Denmark foil fencer, Olympic champion
 Dr. Ivan Osiier, represented Denmark in seven Olympic Games between 1908 and 1948.  Won the silver medal at the 1912 Summer Olympics.

Estonia

 Svetlana Chirkova-Lozovaja, most-successful Estonian fencer of the Soviet era. Olympic gold medal for Women's Foil team event at 1968 Summer Olympics, World champion in Women's Foil team event at 1971, silver 1969, individual World Championships bronze medal 1969.
 Kaido Kaaberma, Estonian épéeist, bronze (1990) & gold (1991) at World Championships team event (as a part of the Soviet team). Individual World Championships bronze (1999). Team World Championships silver (2001).
 Irina Embrich, Estonian épéeist, silver (2002) at World Championships women's team event, bronze (2003) at European Championships women's team event, silver (2006) at World Championships women's individual event, bronze (2007) at World Championships and European Championships women's individual event. European Champion in Team Women's Épée (2013).
 Julia Beljajeva
 Sven Järve, Estonian épéeist, bronze in Individual Men's Épée (2006).
 Nikolai Novosjolov, Estonian épéeist, Two time World Champion in Individual Men's Épée (2010, 2013). Team World Championships silver (2001). European Championships silver (2012).
 Julia Beljajeva, Estonian épéeist, World Champion in Individual Women's Épée (2013). European Champion in Team Women's Épée (2013).
France

 Marc Cerboni, French fencer (foil), won one bronze medal at the Los Angeles Olympics in 1984.
 Yves Dreyfus, French fencer (épée), national champion
 Lucien Gaudin, twice World Champion (1905 & 1918), won four Gold and three Silver Olympic medals covering all three weapons
 Laura Flessel-Colovic, French épéeist who, with two gold, a silver and two bronze medals, is current most successful female French sportswoman at the Winter or Summer Olympics.
 Alexandre Lippmann, French fencer (épée), Olympic champion.
 Armand Mouyal, French fencer (épée), national champion
 Claude Netter, French fencer (foil), Olympic champion
 Christian d'Oriola, French Olympic and World Champion, named "Fencer of the 20th Century" by the FIE, International Fencing Federation, in 2001. Between 1947 & 1956 won four World Championships & six Olympic Medals, including two individual gold (foil), one individual silver (foil), two team gold (foil), and one team silver (foil). In addition to four-time Individual World Champion, four-time team World Champion.
 Jean Stern, French fencer (épée), Olympic champion

Finland

 Marianne Sjöblom, competed in the 1952 Summer Olympics.
 Nils Sjöblom, competed at the 1948 and 1952 Summer Olympics.

Germany

 Helene Mayer, German-Jewish foilist, won Gold at 1928 Summer Olympics & the 1929 World Championship, left for US in 1931, returned to represent Germany in 1936 Summer Olympics and won Silver, went back to US and was granted US citizenship, returned to Germany in 1952 and died of cancer in 1953, won the US Championships eight times.

Great Britain

 Connie Adam, veteran fencer who took up fencing aged 60 and went on to win 140 medals.
 Bob Anderson, represented Great Britain at the Olympic Games in 1952 and the World Championships in 1950 and 1953 in the sabre event. Went on to a career as sword master and fight director for movies, including the Lord of the Rings trilogy, the original Star Wars trilogy, and Princess Bride. He coached Britain's national fencing team for over 20 years.
 Robert Bruniges, World Junior Foil Champion 1976, three-time Olympian
 Richard Cohen, five-time British sabre Champion, best known today as the author of "By the Sword", a highly acclaimed book on the history of fencing
 Mary Glen Haig, four-time Olympic competitor and IOC member
 Bill Hoskyns, 1958 World Épée Champion, Olympic Team Silver Medallist in 1960 and Individual Silver Medallist in 1964. Fenced in the Olympics a record six times (1956–1976), twice at all three weapons. Eight times British Champion, won four Commonwealth Gold medals and one silver at different weapons on separate occasions. The last British fencer to win an Olympic medal.
 Allan Jay, Épée & foil fencer; four-time national champion
 Ralph Johnson, Epeeist, six-time British Épée Champion, four-time Olympian, Commonwealth Games Épée Team Champion 1970, 7th in 1977 World Fencing Championships, three-time World Veteran Épée Champion (2004, 2005, 2008), two-time Commonwealth Veteran Épée Champion (2005, 2009), European Veteran Épée Champion (2003), 24-time Kent Épée Champion. Also British Under-Twenty Foil Champion 1967 and British Junior Foil Champion 1971
 Richard Kruse, Foilist, the most successful male British fencer for several decades, reached quarter-finals (L8) at the 2004 Summer Olympics, in 2006 won silver medal in Men's Foil at European championships, pupil of Ziemowit Wojciechowski. First British fencer to achieve the world's top ranking in 2019.
Raymond Paul, Double Commonwealth Games gold medallist
René Paul, competed at four Olympic Game and won ten Commonwealth Games medals
 Fiona McIntosh, four-time British foil Champion, winner of the 1990 Commonwealth Fencing Championships and a total of 12 Commonwealth medals, four-time Olympian and finalist in Barcelona 1992, author and magazine writer
 Alex O'Connell, Sabreur, Cadet Champion in 2005, ranked as Junior World number 1 for a while in 2007, only Brit to qualify for 2008 Beijing Olympics via zonal qualification in Europe
 Barry Paul, Foilist, five-time British national Champion, three-time Olympian and Managing Director of the only manufacturer of fencing equipment in the UK
 Edgar Seligman, won British championship twice in each weapon, twice won the Olympic silver (épée)
 James Williams – Sabreur, reached L16 at the 2000 Summer Olympics

Hungary

 Péter Bakonyi, Hungarian fencer (sabre), three-time Olympic bronze
 László Borsody, Hungarian fencing master
 Ilona Elek, Hungarian fencer (foil), two-time Olympic champion
 Sándor Erdös, Hungarian fencer (épée), Olympic champion
 Dezső Földes, Hungarian fencer (sabre), Olympic champion
 Péter Fröhlich, Hungarian master & Olympic coach
 Jenő Fuchs, Hungarian fencer (sabre), Olympic champion
 Tamás Gábor, Hungarian fencer (épée), Olympic champion
 János Garay, Hungarian fencer (sabre), Olympic champion
 Oskar Gerde, Hungarian fencer (sabre), Olympic champion
 Aladár Gerevich, Hungarian sabreur; only athlete to win the same Olympic event six times.
 Pál Gerevich, Hungarian sabreur; son of Aladár Gerevich; Individual Sabre World champion (1977), four-time Team Sabre World champion (1973, 1978, 1981, 1982); "Hungarian Sportsman of the Year" (1977)
 Pál Kovács, Hungarian fencer (sabre), six-time Olympic champion
 Sándor Gombos, Hungarian fencer (sabre), Olympic champion
 Rudolf Kárpáti, six-time Olympic & seven-time World sabre champion
 Endre Kabos, Hungarian fencer (sabre), Olympic champion
 Daniel Magay, Hungarian fencer (sabre), Olympic champion
 Ferenc Marki, Hungarian fencing master
 Attila Petschauer, Hungarian fencer (sabre), Olympic champion
 György Piller, Hungarian fencer, Olympic champion and coach, fencing master
 Zoltan Ozoray Schenker, Hungarian fencer (sabre and foil), Olympic champion
 Istvan Szelei, Hungarian fencer (foil), 1980 & 1988 Olympic Squads.
 László Szabó, Hungarian master; defined a system for developing coaches and wrote "Fencing and the Master"; the only direct student of the legendary Italo Santelli to write of what he learned. Teacher of Olympic & World champions.
 Ildikó Újlaky-Rejtő, Hungarian fencer (foil), was twice Olympic champion
 Zsolt Vadaszffy, Hungarian Foil Champion and British Professional Épée Champion. Senior Coach to British under-20 team for eight years.
 Lajos Werkner, Hungarian fencer (sabre), Olympic champion
 Bence Szabó, Hungarian fencer (sabre), twice Olympic champion
 Tímea Nagy, Hungarian fencer (épée), twice Olympic champion

Israel
 Boaz Ellis, at foil, five-time Jewish Israeli national champion, and three-time NCAA champion after his junior year at Ohio State University.
 Lydia Hatuel-Czuckermann, Israeli fencer (foil), 16-time Israeli national champion – Guinness Record, took part at three Olympic Games – Los Angeles 1984, Barcelona 1992, Atlanta 1996.
 Noam Mills, Israel (épée), female junior world champion
 Ayelet Ohayon, Israeli fencer (foil)
 Andre Spitzer (1945–September 6, 1972), Jewish Israeli fencing master & coach of Israel's 1972 Summer Olympics team. One of 11 athletes and coaches taken hostage and subsequently murdered by Palestinian terrorists in the Munich massacre.

Italy

 Edoardo Mangiarotti, won more Olympic titles and World championships than any other fencer in the history of the sport; a member of the Mangiarotti fencing clan.
 Aldo Nadi, won gold & silver medals at 1920 Olympics; during the Mussolini years emigrated to US, where he penned the influential "On Fencing" and his autobiographical notes entitled "The Living Sword"; brother of Nedo Nadi.
 Nedo Nadi, won six Olympic Gold medals: three foil, two sabre, and one épée; brother of Aldo Nadi.
 Giorgio Santelli, born in Hungary, son of Italo Santelli, won Gold at 1920 Olympics as part of the Italian sabre team; emigrated to US in 1924, coached five U.S. Olympic teams, legendary fencing teacher & popularizer, founder of Santelli salle in New York City.
 Italo Santelli, fencing master who revolutionized sabre fencing and developed the modern Hungarian style in the 1920s.
 Giulio Gaudini, won three Olympic gold, four silver and two bronze medals in three Summer Olympic Games (1928 Summer Olympics, 1932 Summer Olympics, 1936 Summer Olympics).
 Antonella Ragno-Lonzi, Individual Foil Olympic Champion 1972 Summer Olympics.
 Fabio Dal Zotto, Individual Foil Olympic Champion 1976 Summer Olympics.
 Mauro Numa, Individual and Team Foil Olympic Champion 1984 Summer Olympics, Individual and Team Foil World Champion 1985, Team Foil World Champion 1986.
 Valentina Vezzali, won six Olympic Gold medals and 15 World Championships Gold medals in foil. She is one of only four athletes in the history of the Summer Olympic Games to have won five medals in the same individual event.

Korea (Republic of Korea)

 Kim JiYeon (Sabre), Individual Sabre Olympic Champion (2012 London Olympics)
 Kim Jun Ho (Sabre), three-time team Asian champion, three-time team world champion, and Team Sabre Olympic Champion (2020 Tokyo Olympics)
 Gu Bon Gil (Sabre), Team Sabre Olympic Champion (2012 London Olympics)
 Nam Hyun Hee (Foil), Individual Foil Silver (2008 Beijing Olympics), Team Foil Bronze (2012 London Olympics)
 Jeon Hee Suk (Foil), Team Foil Bronze (2012 London Olympics)
 Choi Byung Chul (Foil), Individual Foil Bronze (2012 London Olympics)
 Shin A Lam (Épée), Team Foil Silver (2012 London Olympics)
Jung Jin Sun (Épée), Individual Épée Bronze (2012 London Olympics)

Philippines

 Don Francisco Dayrit Sr., Filipino fencer, known as the Father of Philippine Fencing, FIE Hall of Fame.

Poland

 Danuta Dmowska, Polish fencer, World and European champion
 Egon Franke, Polish fencer, three-time Olympic medallist, world champion
 Ryszard Parulski, Polish fencer, Olympic silver and bronze medallist
 Jerzy Pawłowski, Polish fencer, five-time Olympic medallist, seven-time world champion
 Ryszard Sobczak, Polish fencer, Olympic silver and bronze medallist
 Aleksandra Socha, Polish fencer, double European champion
 Witold Woyda, Polish fencer, double Olympic champion
 Barbara Wysoczańska, Polish fencer, Olympic bronze medallist
 Wojciech Zabłocki, Polish fencer, four-time world champion

Romania

 Ana Maria Brânză, world champion in 2010 with the team, multiple European champion with the team in 2006, 2008, 2009 and 2011.
 Mihai Covaliu, Olympic champion, coach of the Romanian fencing team.
 Rareș Dumitrescu, sabreur, won the silver medal at the London 2012 Olympics in the team contest, world champion with the team in 2009, European champion with the team in 2006.
 Tiberiu Dolniceanu, sabreur, won the silver medal at the London 2012 Olympics in the team contest, world champion with the team in 2009, European champion with the team in 2006.
 Simona Gherman, world champion in 2010 with the team, multiple European champion with the team in 2006, 2008, 2009 and 2011.
 Anca Măroiu, world champion in 2010 with the team, multiple European champion with the team in 2006, 2008, 2009 and 2011.
 Florin Zalomir, sabreur, won the silver medal at the London 2012 Olympics in the team contest, world champion with the team in 2009, European champion with the team in 2006.

Russia/Soviet Union

 Pavel Kolobkov, épéeist, Olympic Champion 2000, 5-time World Champion (1991, 1993, 1994, 2002, 2005), twice Junior World Champion (1987, 1988), winner of 1999 World Cup
 Grigory Kriss, Soviet fencer (épée), Olympic champion
 Viktor Krovopouskov, sabreur, four-time Olympic Gold medallist (1976 & 1980 individual, and team), twice individual World Champion (1978, 1982), twice won the World Cup (1976, 1979)
 Maria Mazina, Jewish Russian fencer (épée), Olympic champion
 Mark Midler, foilist, Jewish Russian member of first generation of internationally successful Soviet fencers, took Gold at 1956 & 1960 Olympics as a part of Soviet team, won four consecutive World Championships (1959–62).
 Vladimir Nazlymov, sabreur/coach, won individual World Championship in 1975 & 1979 and the World Cup in 1975 & 1977, took team Gold at 1968, 1976, and 1980 Olympics, and at 1967, 1969–71, 1974, 1975, 1977, 1979 World Championships, twice named the world's best sabre fencer by the FIE, currently head fencing coach of the Ohio State University fencing team.
 Boris Onishchenko, modern pentathlete, individual silver medallist and team gold medallist in 1972, disqualified in 1976 for using a rigged weapon
 Stanislav Pozdnyakov, sabreur, Olympic (1996) & World (1997, 2001, 2002, 2006, 2007) Champion, seven-time winner of the World Cup (1994–96, 1999–2002), member of winning Russian sabre team at 1992, 1996, 2000, and 2004 Olympics, and at 1994, 2001, 2002, and 2003 World Championships
 Mark Rakita, Jewish Russian sabreur, twice Olympic Champion (1964, 1968), World Champion in 1967, David Tyshler's pupil and coach in his own right (pupils include Viktor Sidjak)
 Alexander Romankov, Russian foilist, ten-time World Champion
 Yakov Rylsky, Jewish Russian sabreur, twice Olympic (1964, 1968) and three-time World (1958, 1961, 1963) Champion, represented USSR over a period of 14 years (1953–66)
 Sergey Sharikov, Jewish Russian sabreur, twice Olympic Champion (1996, 2000)
 Viktor Sidjak, Soviet sabreur, four-time Olympic Gold medallist
 Vladimir Smirnov, foilist, won individual Gold at 1980 Summer Olympics, won world championships in 1981, died at 1982 World Championships in Rome, when a broken blade went through his mask causing a fatal brain injury (through the left eye orbit—not the eye itself); his death prompted an extensive review of safety standards in fencing. Tragic though his death was, it ultimately resulted in making the sport statistically safer than golf.
 David Tyshler, Jewish Russian sabreur, member of the first generation of internationally successful Soviet fencers, won medals at 1956 Olympics and five World Championships, best known for his achievements as a coach, one of the founding fathers of the Soviet school of fencing, pupils include Mark Rakita and Viktor Sidjak
 Eduard Vinokurov, Jewish Russian sabreur, twice Olympic Champion (1968, 1976)
 Iosif Vitebskiy, Jewish Russian épée fencer, 19-time national championship medallist.

Sweden

 Johan Harmenberg, Swedish fencer (épée), Olympic champion (1980)
 Björne Väggö, Swedish fencer (épée), Silver medalist in 1984 Olympics

Switzerland

 Marcel Fischer, Swiss fencer (épée), Olympic champion (2004)

Ukraine

 Sergei Golubitsky, World Foil Champion 1997, 1998, 1999; Winner of 1992, 1993, 1994 and 1999 World Cup, Olympic silver medallist 1992.
 Vadim Gutzeit, Ukrainian fencer (saber), Olympic champion

United States of America

 Maitre Michel Alaux (1924–74), French-American fencing master & author; 3-time U.S. Olympic coach.
 Norman Armitage, 17-time national sabre champion
 Albert Axelrod, Jewish American bronze medallist in the 1960 Summer Olympics in foil
 Abraham Balk, only man to win both foil & epeé NCAA championships (1947)
 Cliff Bayer, 4-time U.S. foil champion
 Caitlin Bilodeaux, USFA Women's Foil Champ (1986, '87, '89, '92), she is tied for third on the women's championship list. Pan American Individual and Team champion, 1987, 2-time NCAA women's foil champion (1985, '87) and 4-time NCAA All-America. 2-time U-20 National Champion.
 Tamir Bloom, 2-time U.S. épée champion
 Muriel Bower, first woman fencing master in the U.S.
 Daniel Bukantz, Jewish American Olympian, U.S. Foil Fencer, Member of Jewish Sports Hall of Fame
 Gay Jacobsen D'Asaro, 1976, 1980 Olympian U.S. Women's Foil Fencer (now Gay MacLellan)
 Michael D'Asaro Sr.
 Eli Dershwitz, saber, US champion, junior world champion, 4x Pan-American champion, NCAA champion
Jed Dupree, 2001 NCAA Men's Foil Champion, 2002 U.S. National Champion, 2003 Pan American Gold Medal, 2004 Olympian in Athens
 Csaba Elthes, legendary coach to 6 U.S. Olympic teams, immigrated from Hungary
 Race Imboden, 2011 & 2014 U.S. National Men's Foil Champion, 2011 & 2012 Pan Am Champion, Men's Foil World Cup Gold Medalist (Havana 2013), 2012 Olympian in London
 Emily Jacobson, NCAA sabre champion.
 Sada Jacobson, Jewish American silver medallist in the 2008 Summer Olympics and bronze medallist in the 2004 Summer Olympics and in Sabre; first American female to be ranked # 1 in the world, and the second American ever to be ranked # 1 in the world.  Member of the bronze medal winning U.S. women's sabre team at the 2008 Summer Olympics.
 Dan Kellner, U.S. foil champion
 Ed Korfanty, U.S. National women's sabre team coach.  Formerly Polish national coach.
 Byron Krieger, U.S. 2x Olympian, Pan American Games team gold/silver
Allan Kwartler, U.S. foil & sabre fencer, winner of gold medals in Pan American Games and Maccabiah Games
 Fred Linkmeyer
 Michael Marx 5-time Olympian, Épée & Foil Coach, National Champion
 Helene Mayer, German & U.S. fencer (foil), Olympic champion
 Sharon Monplaisir
 Gerek Meinhardt
 George S. Patton, 4th out of 27 fencers in 1912 Olympic games
 Lisa Piazza, member, 1985 U.S. World Championship team; first alternate, U.S. team, 1988 Olympics.
 Julia Jones Pugliese, first U.S. women's intercollegiate fencing champion (1929), founded the Intercollegiate Women's Fencing Association (with Dorothy Hafner and Elizabeth Ross), first woman coach of an international U.S. fencing team, coached NYU women's team 1932–38, and Hunter team from 1956–92
 Janice Romary, 1948, 1952, 1956, 1960, 1964, 1968 Olympian U.S. Foil Fencer.
 Jason Rogers, member of the silver medal winning U.S. men's sabre team at the 2008 Summer Olympics
 Giorgio Santelli, legendary coach to 5 U.S. Olympic teams (1928–52), Olympic Gold medallist (1920 Men's Sabre Team), son of Italo Santelli (known as the "father of modern sabre fencing" and an Olympic silver medal winner), fought duel after his father was insulted by Italian team Captain.
 Maitre Michel Sebastiani, coached fencing at Princeton University from 1982–2006, and before that coached fencing at Brooklyn College, New York University (NYU), and Cornell.  Coached his teams to 11 national championships.  In 1994 and again in 2006 was named the most outstanding Coach of the Year by U.S. Fencing Coaches Association (USFCA).  Developed 5 NCAA individual men's champions and 3 NCAA individual women's champions.  Was a 1960 French Modern Pentathlon Olympic Team selection.
 Tim Morehouse, won a silver medal in men's sabre at the 2008 Summer Olympics.
 Keeth Smart, first American to be ranked # 1 in the world, member of the silver medal winning U.S. men's sabre team at the 2008 Summer Olympics, member of 2004 gold medal U.S. Men's Sabre team at World Cup
 Soren Thompson, U.S. (épée), NCAA champion and part of world champion épée team
Jonathan Tiomkin, 2-time U.S. foil champion.
Rebecca Ward, bronze medallist in the 2008 Summer Olympics in women's sabre, 2005 FIE Jr. World Champion at age 15.  Member of the bronze medal winning U.S. women's sabre team at the 2008 Summer Olympics.  Part of U.S. Sr. Women's Sabre team that took 2005 World Championship title.  2006 Cadet World Champion, 2006 Jr. World Champion, 2006 Jr. World Champion Team member, 2nd fencer in history to win 3 world titles in one season.
 Peter Westbrook, bronze medalist in the 1984 Summer Olympics, 13-time U.S. National Men's Sabre Champion, author of Harnessing Anger, founder of the Peter Westbrook Foundation, teaching and helping youth through sport.
 Ruth White, competed at the 1972 Summer Olympics, was the first African-American woman to represent the United States at the Olympics and is a Pan American Games medallist
 George Worth, U.S. (saber), Olympic bronze, U.S. champion, 3x Pan American champion
 Mariel Leigh Zagunis, two-time Olympic gold medalist in women's sabre (in the 2008 Summer Olympics and in the first-ever women's sabre event at the 2004 Summer Olympics); first American woman to win gold; first American to win gold since 1904.  Member of the bronze medal winning U.S. women's sabre team at the 2008 Summer Olympics
Venezuela
 Ruben Limardo Gascon, Men's Individual Épée Olympic Champion 2012, 2013 Budapest World Championship Silver Medallist.

Fencing masters of the pre-Olympic era
 

14th Century
 Fiore dei Liberi

15th Century
 Johannes Liechtenauer
 Sigmund Ringeck
 Peter von Danzig Cod. 44 A 8
 Hans Talhoffer

16th Century
 Camillo Agrippa
 Giacomo di Grassi
 Antonio Manciolino
 Achille Marozzo
 Angelo Viggiani
 Giovanni Dall'Agocchie
 Vincentio Saviolo
 George Silver
 Joachim Meyer

17th Century
 Francesco Alfieri
 Salvator Fabris
 Ridolfo Capo Ferro
 Girard Thibault

18th Century
 Domenico Angelo
 Chevalier de Saint-Georges

19th Century
 Alfred Hutton

Famous duelists and fencing enthusiasts
 
 Otto von Bismarck
 Tycho Brahe
 George Byron
 Winston Churchill
 René Descartes
 Neil Diamond
 Bruce Dickinson
 Albrecht Dürer
 Reinhard Heydrich
 Jean-François Lamour
 Colonel Thomas Hoyer Monstery
 Benito Mussolini
 George S. Patton, General and U.S. Army Master of the Sword. Designer of the Model 1913 Cavalry Saber. 1912 Stockholm Olympics in the first modern pentathlon competition (Ranked 1st in fencing – 8th overall).
 José Rizal
 Theodore Roosevelt
 Sylvester Stallone
 Arnold Schwarzenegger
 Otto Skorzeny

References

External links
Masters - https://wiktenauer.com/wiki/Masters